The Men's team pursuit competition at the 2017 World Championships was held on 12 and 13 April 2017.

Results

Qualifying
The fastest 8 teams qualify for the first round, from which the top 4 remain in contention for the gold medal final and the other 4 for the bronze medal final.

 Canada were disqualified for breaching article 3.2.097
 Q = qualified; in contention for gold medal final
 q = qualified; in contention for bronze medal final

First round
First round heats are held as follows:
Heat 1: 6th v 7th fastest
Heat 2: 5th v 8th fastest
Heat 3: 2nd v 3rd fastest
Heat 4: 1st v 4th fastest

The winners of heats 3 and 4 proceeded to the gold medal final.
The remaining 6 teams were ranked on time, from which the top 2 proceeded to the bronze medal final.

 QG = qualified for gold medal final
 QB = qualified for bronze medal final

Finals
The final was held at 19:53.

References

Men's team pursuit
UCI Track Cycling World Championships – Men's team pursuit